Oospila confundaria is a moth of the family Geometridae first described by Heinrich Benno Möschler in 1890. It is found from Guatemala to Brazil and on the Greater and Lesser Antilles.

References

Moths described in 1890
Geometrinae